Costa Rica women's national under-20 football team represents Costa Rica in international youth football competitions.

Fixtures and results

 Legend

2022

Competitive record

FIFA U-20 Women's World Cup
The team has qualified in 2010, 2014 and 2022 as host.

CONCACAF Women's U-20 Championship

Previous squads

 2010 FIFA U-20 Women's World Cup
 2014 FIFA U-20 Women's World Cup

See also

 Costa Rica women's national football team
 Costa Rica women's national under-17 football team

References

External links

 Official website
 FIFA profile

Central American women's national under-20 association football teams
Women's football in Costa Rica